Henry Peter Carter Simmons-Anderson (16 November 1871 – 11 July 1934) was a Barbadian cricketer. He played in eleven first-class matches for the Barbados cricket team from 1898 to 1908.

References

External links
 

1871 births
1934 deaths
Barbadian cricketers
Barbados cricketers
People from Christ Church, Barbados